The Transnational Institute (TNI), is an international non-profit research and advocacy think tank that was founded in 1974, Amsterdam, Netherlands. According to their website, the organization promotes a "... just, democratic and sustainable world."

History 
TNI was founded in 1974 in Amsterdam by Eqbal Ahmad, who was the organization's first director. Initially it operated as an international arm of the Institute for Policy Studies.

In 1976 the director of the institute (Orlando Letelier) was assassinated by the Chilean secret police as ordered by Augusto Pinochet.

Pauline Tiffen is chair of the supervisory board of the TNI.

The activist Susan George is president of the TNI.

The members of the institute are involved in the civil society and the associative life of their respective countries. Based in Amsterdam, the permanent team of TNI consisted of twenty nine people in 2021.

Work

The TNI publishes research papers, books and organises seminars and debates. Its members include activists, researchers, writers, scholars, journalists and documentary makers. The organisation has specific interest sections called "programs". These are the fields the organisation currently focuses on.

Drugs and democracy 

The program analyses worldwide trends on drugs-policies and promotes a pragmatic approach to drugs based on damage-control. It has written on countries in Latin America and Southeast Asia.

Ricardo Soberón, the Lawyer who was the drug tsar for Peru until 2012, has carried out research for TNI.

Public alternatives 

The public alternatives program publishes research and organises events on the following topics

 The effects of privatisation such as water privatisation
 Energy democracy
 The return of public services or re-municipalization for which it has documented more than 200 cases.
 Transformative Cities
 Participatory democracy

Trade and investment

Publications
 Financialisation: A Primer (2018 update) - about financialization

Other programs
 Myanmar
 War & Pacification
 Colombia
 Agrarian & Environmental Justice
 Corporate Power

References

External links 
 
 Archive at the International Institute of Social History.
 SourceWatch
 Worldcat

Think tanks based in the Netherlands
Political and economic think tanks based in the European Union
Think tanks established in 1974
Members of the International Science Council